Osred may refer to:

 Osred I of Northumbria (c. 697 – 716), king of Northumbria
 Osred II of Northumbria, king of Northumbria from 789 to 790